The Diocese of Limón is a Latin Church ecclesiastical territory or diocese of the Catholic Church in Costa Rica. It is a suffragan diocese in the ecclesiastical province of the metropolitan Archdiocese of San José de Costa Rica. It was erected 16 February 1921 as a apostolic vicariate, elevated to a diocese on 30 December 1994.

Ordinaries
Agustín Blessing Presinger, C.M. (1921–1934)
Carlos Alberto Wollgarten, C.M. (1935–1937)
Juan Paulo Odendahl Metz, C.M. (1938–1957)
Alfonso Hoefer Hombach, C.M. (1958–1979)
Alfonso Coto Monge (1980–1994)
José Francisco Ulloa Rojas (1994–2005), appointed Bishop of Cartago
José Rafael Quirós Quirós (2005–2013), appointed Archbishop of San José de Costa Rica
Javier Gerardo Román Arias (2015–present)

Territorial losses

See also
Catholic Church in Costa Rica

References

External links
Diocesis de Limón  official site (in Spanish)
 

Limon
Limon
Limon
1921 establishments in Costa Rica